The Mount Hope Bridge is a two-lane suspension bridge spanning the Mount Hope Bay in eastern Rhode Island at one of the narrowest gaps in Narragansett Bay. The bridge connects the Rhode Island towns of Portsmouth and Bristol and is part of Route 114. The railing along the bridge is only  and since 2016 there is a dedicated coalition (Bridging the Gap for Safety & Healing) advocating for the installation of physical safety/suicide prevention barriers on Mount Hope Bridge (along with the Claiborne Pell Newport Bridge, Jamestown-Verrazzano and Sakonnet Bridge).

History
Before the bridge was built, a ferry operated between Bristol and Portsmouth. The 1855 Bristol Ferry Light still remains at the base of the bridge. The Mount Hope Bridge was originally proposed in 1920, and the New Hope Bridge Company was incorporated in 1927, after a few years of resistance from the Rhode Island General Assembly and with the influence of state senator and business leader William Henry Vanderbilt III. Construction began on December 1, 1927, using a design by Robinson & Steinman.

Serious structural problems were discovered four months before it was to open, forcing the contractor to disassemble and reassemble portions of the bridge.

On October 24, 1929, Vanderbilt gave the opening address at the dedication ceremony where a radio link was set up with Washington, D.C. The $5,000,000 bridge was opened to traffic and, five days later, the Wall Street Crash of 1929 occurred. It was owned by the Mount Hope Bridge Company as a private toll bridge, with the initial toll costing 60 cents one way, and $1 for a round-trip. By 1931, the Bridge company went bankrupt, and prominent local brewer Rudolf F. Haffenreffer acquired the bridge in receivership.

It remained the longest suspension bridge in New England for 40 years, until the Claiborne Pell Bridge opened a few miles to the south in Newport, Rhode Island.

In 1971, the Mount Hope Bridge was considered for inclusion as part of the never-built Interstate 895. This plan would have required the construction of a parallel span, and the entire I-895 plan was eventually dropped due to community opposition throughout the projected route.

The Mount Hope Bridge was listed on the National Register of Historic Places in 1976.

It underwent more than $15 million in renovations between 1998 and 2004.

In 2007, Bicycles were permitted on the bridge, but bicyclists were advised to use extreme caution. The bridge also has narrow sidewalks on both sides, but pedestrians are strictly prohibited from using it.

The bridge is in close proximity to the East Bay Bikeway which runs from Providence to Bristol, RI. The bridge itself is demarcated as a continuation (not connected to the main bike path and not safe for those with young children as there is no sidewalk for the majority of the way) of that state bike route by the State of Rhode Island and Providence Plantations, although it does not contain a bicycle lane or separate bike route. Signs have been posted on the bridge urging motorists to "share the road". A full, off-road bike route will be completed in an estimated three years which will cross the bridge from the current terminus of the bike path in Bristol and continue on the other side through the full length of Aquidneck Island to Newport.

Bridge tokens
The Mount Hope Bridge was purchased by the State of Rhode Island in 1954, with the company in receivership. The bridge's toll was eventually reduced from 60 cents to 30 cents for a one-way trip. It was finally discontinued in 1998, after calculations indicated that the toll was not high enough to cover the cost of collecting it.

See also

National Register of Historic Places listings in Bristol County, Rhode Island
List of bridges on the National Register of Historic Places in Rhode Island

References

External links

Photograph of Mount Hope Bridge by Kathleen Murtagh
Mount Hope Bridge page on BostonRoads.com
 
Mount Hope Bridge Records from the Rhode Island State Archives
Mount Hope Bridge building, opening and maintenance photographs from the Rhode Island State Archives
Report of the Mount Hope Toll Bridge Commission from the Rhode Island State Archives

Narragansett Bay
Suspension bridges in Rhode Island
Bridges in Newport County, Rhode Island
Buildings and structures in Bristol, Rhode Island
Buildings and structures in Portsmouth, Rhode Island
Towers in Rhode Island
Bridges in Bristol County, Rhode Island
1929 establishments in Rhode Island
Bridges completed in 1929
National Register of Historic Places in Newport County, Rhode Island
Road bridges on the National Register of Historic Places in Rhode Island
Former toll bridges in Rhode Island
National Register of Historic Places in Bristol County, Rhode Island